Chack No 42/12-L also known as Agra is a village which is in Chichawatni Tehsil, Sahiwal District, Punjab, Pakistan. It is almost 5 km away from Chichawatni on the Okanwala road. Most of the people settled here are those who migrated from the villages of Wazir Abad in 1906. The canal which irrigates the lands of this village is 12-L and was dug in the year 1914, so after this the people settled here started farming on regular basis.

References

Populated places in Sahiwal District